Jeffrey Brian "Jeff" Garner (born August 18, 1978) is an American fashion designer and visual artist. His designs are sold online and in luxury boutiques throughout America, Canada, the UK and China. His designs have been worn to the Academy Awards and on stage. He is perhaps best known for his sustainable 'plant-dyed' red carpet gowns (made mostly in Tennessee) and for inclusion in the Smithsonian's Renwick Gallery 40 under 40 exhibition in July 2012. Garner takes his inspiration from the dressmakers of the Civil War period who worked with what was in front of them, fashioning beautiful gowns that were later taken apart to recreate new dresses – sustainability born out of necessity. Garner's designs have a sophistication that sets them apart from typical organic clothing. With Prophetik, Jeff Garner combines a dandyish, rock 'n' roll aesthetic with a robust sustainable philosophy, never compromising his ethical principals or his style credentials. That's why everyone from Kings of Leon to Taylor Swift wears his designs.

Early life 
He was born in the Civil War town of Franklin, Tennessee to Don and Peggy Lynn Garner, a business owner and mother respectively . He was raised on a horse farm outside Nashville.

Garner graduated from David Lipscomb High School in Nashville and Pepperdine University in Malibu, California.

Career 

Garner worked in Los Angeles for production company Stiletto Entertainment as creative director for artists such as Barry Manilow, Fleetwood Mac, and Donna Summer.  In 2000, to help pay for university, Garner booked the Mattel Blaine Barbie role for National and International commercials produced by Mattel Toys.

In 2003, he returned to Nashville to start Driven Clothing, a band merchandise and stage clothing line. There he began Prophetik Clothing, an all-sustainable eco fashion lifestyle brand, later showing at Magic Fashion Trade Show in Las Vegas, where he found retail distribution. He took part in SS10 London Fashion week in February 2010 at Vauxhall Fashion Scout. Garner also received personal mentorships under Calvin Klein and J Lindeberg.

He continued to show at the London Fashion Week, Canada Fashion week, and China Fashion week. Prophetik partnered with Griffin distribution in September 2010, placing handmade up-cycled coach leather iPhone wallets in Apple stores around the world, launching at London Fashion week in September 2010. Garner was inducted into Renwick Gallery in July 2012. Grammy winner Esperanza Spalding wore a Garner dress to the 84th Academy Awards in February 2012. Vogue magazine featured the dress on their website.   In December 2013, Garner was inducted into the Costume & Textile Institute of the Tennessee State Museum.

Garner most recently took part in both London and Shanghai Fashion week with his sustainable collection "Nevermore" SS17 listed on Vogue.

References

External links 

 
 
 
 

American fashion designers
1978 births
People from Franklin, Tennessee
Pepperdine University alumni
Living people